Alwisi's shadowdamsel (Ceylanosticta nancyae) is a species of damselfly in the family Platystictidae. It is endemic to Sri Lanka, which was found recently from Samanala Nature Reserve, Ratnapura.

Etymology
The species name nancyae was named as an honor for Nancy van der Poorten, who is a renowned Sri Lanka odonatologist, and mentor of the research team.

See also
 List of odonates of Sri Lanka

References

Damselflies of Sri Lanka
Insects described in 2016